Albert Durrant Watson (January 8, 1859 – May 3, 1926) was a Canadian poet, and physician.

Life
He graduated from Victoria University, and Edinburgh University.  He practiced medicine for more than forty years in the city of Toronto.

Watson was born in a family of a reformer in politics and a Methodist in religion. He held a series of seances from 1918 to 1920 by medium Louis Benjamin. He joined the Bahá'í Faith in 1920, was active in the Toronto community, and publishing poems related to the religion in the 1920s in and beyond Bahá'í publications.

Works

 "The Norse Discovery of America", Journal of the Royal Astronomical Society of Canada, 1923, v17, pp257.

Poetry
"A Hymn for Canada", Canadian Medical Association Journal

  
Dream of God: A Poem (1922)

Anthologies

Psychic

Dr. Albert Durrant Watson, a prominent Canadian psychic investigator, claimed to be the first to receive a message from Dr. James H. Hyslop who died on June 17, 1920, in Upper Montclaire, New Jersey,  "Hyslop's Society Scooped By Canada" The New York Times, Tuesday, June 22, 1920.

References

1859 births
1926 deaths
20th-century Canadian poets
19th-century Canadian poets
Canadian male poets
19th-century Canadian male writers
20th-century Canadian male writers